Englehart (Canada 2016 Census population 1,479) is a town in the Canadian province of Ontario, located on the Blanche River in the Timiskaming District.

Kap-Kig-Iwan Provincial Park is located near the town of Englehart.

History

The Town of Englehart was created by the building of the Temiskaming and Northern Ontario (T & NO) Railway and named after Chairman Jacob Lewis Englehart.  It was incorporated as the Town of Englehart in January 1908, as a half-way divisional point between North Bay, Ontario and what became Cochrane, Ontario, where the T & NO Railway met with the new Transcontinental Railway line (now the CNR) being built west from Quebec City across the north to the Western Provinces, creating the town of Cochrane.

In 1905, Jacob Lewis Englehart, from Ohio, became a key figure in the development of the railway north of North Bay in Ontario. A successful businessman from Petrolia, Ontario, nearing the current age of retirement, he was appointed in 1905, by the Premier of Ontario, to the Ontario Commission in charge of building and operating the T & NO, which would, about 1945, become the Ontario Northland Railway. He served as Chairman of a new 3-man Commission from 1906 until the fall of 1919, when he retired after the United Farmers of Ontario won their first and only four-year term in the Province of Ontario. He died at York, now Toronto, in 1921 and was buried at Petrolia.

The new community of Englehart began to take shape with the construction of the line's first major bridge at the Charlton branch of Blanche River (Initially, there was a construction site for a high level trestle known as Blanche River Crossing, which opened in 1906. The Commission decided to develop a planned town on the west side of the river, from 1906-1908, as a half-way divisional point on the railway.
 
The railway was particularly central to the settlement and development of New Ontario (now N.E. Ont.); that is, until the first gravel road,(the Ferguson Highway, now part of Highway 11) was opened in 1927 north from North Bay to New Liskeard in the Temiskaming District, with future extensions north and west as the initial Trans-Canada Highway route.

The T & NO was eventually extended north to Moosonee on James Bay in the depression years of the 1930s.  Today, Englehart's importance as a railway town has diminished, and the biggest employer is an oriented strand board (OSB) facility built by Grants Forest Products, which was sold to Georgia-Pacific in early 2010 as a result of the recession of 2008.

Demographics 

Media

CJBB-FM broadcasts a country music radio format on from Englehart on 103.1 FM.

Transportation
The Englehart railway station was served by the Northlander until the passenger service was ended in September 2012. Rail passenger service was replaced by increased bus service, also provided by Ontario Northland Railway. Englehart is located on Ontario Highway 11, part of the Trans-Canada Highway system.

See also

 List of towns in Ontario
 List of townships in Ontario
 List of population centres in Ontario

References

External links

Municipalities in Timiskaming District
Single-tier municipalities in Ontario
Towns in Ontario